Two Girls on the Street (Hungarian: Két lány az utcán) is a 1939 Hungarian film directed by André de Toth, one of his first features, based on a play by Tamás Emöd and Rezsö Török.

Plot 
Two young women, a musician and a bricklayer, navigate their careers, friendships, and love lives in Budapest after running away from their home village.

Cast

Restoration  
Two Girls on the Street was selected for preservation by the World Cinema Project; the print was restored by Cinémathèque de Bologne and Immagine Ritrovata. The restoration premiered at the 2010 Cannes Film Festival. In 2022, this restoration was released as part of Martin Scorsese’s World Cinema Project Vol. 4 alongside the 1948 Uday Shankar film Kalpana as spine 1147 in The Criterion Collection .

References

External Links 
 

1939 films
Hungarian drama films
Films directed by Andre DeToth